Hrabove is a village in Northwestern Ukraine, in Kovel Raion of Volyn Oblast, but was formerly administered within Shatsk Raion. The village is near the border between Ukraine and Poland.

Villages in Kovel Raion